

Peerage of England

|Earl of Surrey (1088)||John de Warenne, 7th Earl of Surrey||1304||1347||
|-
|Earl of Warwick (1088)||Thomas de Beauchamp, 11th Earl of Warwick||1315||1369||
|-
|Earl of Arundel (1138)||Edmund FitzAlan, 9th Earl of Arundel||1302||1326||Attainted and his honours were forfeited
|-
|Earl of Oxford (1142)||Robert de Vere, 6th Earl of Oxford||1297||1331||
|-
|Earl of Salisbury (1145)||Alice de Lacy, 5th Countess of Salisbury||1310||1322||Surrendered to the Crown
|-
|rowspan="2"|Earl of Hereford (1199)||Humphrey de Bohun, 4th Earl of Hereford||1298||1322||Died
|-
|John de Bohun, 5th Earl of Hereford||1322||1336||
|-
|Earl of Lincoln (1217)||Alice de Lacy, 4th Countess of Lincoln||1311||1348||
|-
|Earl of Pembroke (1247)||Aymer de Valence, 2nd Earl of Pembroke||1296||1324||Died, title reverted to the Crown
|-
|rowspan="2"|Earl of Leicester (1265)||Thomas Plantagenet, 2nd Earl of Leicester and Lancaster||1296||1322||Attainted, and his honours were forfeited
|-
|Henry Plantagenet, 3rd Earl of Leicester and Lancaster||1326||1345||Restored
|-
|Earl of Richmond (1306)||John of Brittany, Earl of Richmond||1306||1334||
|-
|Earl of Norfolk (1312)||Thomas of Brotherton, 1st Earl of Norfolk||1312||1338||
|-
|Earl of Kent (1321)||Edmund of Woodstock, 1st Earl of Kent||1321||1330||New creation
|-
|Earl of Carlisle (1322)||Andrew Harclay, 1st Earl of Carlisle||1322||1323||Created Baron Harcla in 1321; attainted, and the title was forfeited
|-
|Earl of Winchester (1322)||Hugh le Despenser, 1st Earl of Winchester||1322||1326||Forfeited
|-
|Earl of March (1328)||Roger Mortimer, 1st Earl of March||1328||1330||New creation
|-
|Baron de Ros (1264)||William de Ros, 2nd Baron de Ros||1216||1342||
|-
|Baron le Despencer (1264)||Hugh le Despencer, 2nd Baron le Despencer||1265||1326||Created Earl of Winchester, see above; barony attainted in 1326
|-
|Baron Basset of Drayton (1264)||Ralph Basset, 2nd Baron Basset of Drayton||1299||1343||
|-
|rowspan="2"|Baron Basset of Sapcote (1264)||Ralph Basset, 3rd Baron Basset of Sapcote||1300||1326||Never summoned to Parliament; died
|-
|Simon Basset, 4th Baron Basset of Sapcote||1326||1360||Never summoned to Parliament
|-
|rowspan="2"|Baron Mowbray (1283)||John de Mowbray, 2nd Baron Mowbray||1297||1322||Died
|-
|John de Mowbray, 3rd Baron Mowbray||1322||1361||
|-
|rowspan="2"|Baron Hastings (1290)||John Hastings, 2nd Baron Hastings||1313||1325||Died
|- 
|Laurence Hastings, 3rd Baron Hastings||1325||1348||
|- 
|Baron Astley (1295)||Thomas de Astley, 3rd Baron Astley||1314||1359||
|- 
|rowspan="3"|Baron Berkeley (1295)||Thomas de Berkeley, 1st Baron Berkeley||1295||1321||Died
|- 
|Maurice de Berkeley, 2nd Baron Berkeley||1321||1326||Died
|- 
|Thomas de Berkeley, 3rd Baron Berkeley||1326||1361||
|- 
|Baron Boteler (1295)||William le Boteler, 1st Baron Boteler||1295||1328||Died; none of his descendants were summoned to Parliament in respect of this Barony
|- 
|Baron Canville (1295)||William de Canville, 2nd Baron Canville||1308||1338||
|- 
|Baron Clavering (1295)||John de Clavering, 2nd Baron Clavering||1310||1332||
|- 
|rowspan="2"|Baron Corbet (1295)||Piers Corbet, 2nd Baron Corbet||1300||1322||Died
|- 
|John Corbet, 3rd Baron Corbet||1322||1347||
|- 
|Baron Fauconberg (1295)||John de Fauconberg, 3rd Baron Fauconberg||1318||1349||
|- 
|rowspan="3"|Baron FitzWalter (1295)||Robert FitzWalter, 1st Baron FitzWalter||1295||1325||Died
|- 
|Robert FitzWalter, 2nd Baron FitzWalter||1325||1328||Died
|- 
|John FitzWalter, 3rd Baron FitzWalter||1328||1361||
|- 
|Baron FitzWarine (1295)||Fulke FitzWarine, 2nd Baron FitzWarine||1315||1349||
|- 
|Baron FitzWilliam (1295)||Ralph FitzWilliam, 3rd Baron FitzWilliam||1317||1321||Summoned as Baron Greystock, see below
|- 
|Baron Giffard (1295)||John Giffard, 2nd Baron Giffard||1299||1322||Attainted, and his honours were forfeited
|- 
|rowspan="2"|Baron Grey de Wilton (1295)||John Grey, 2nd Baron Grey de Wilton||1308||1323||Died
|-
|Henry Grey, 3rd Baron Grey de Wilton||1323||1342||
|-
|Baron Hussee (1295)||Henry Hussee, 1st Baron Hussee||1295||1332||
|- 
|rowspan="2"|Baron Hylton (1295)||Robert Hylton, 1st Baron Hylton||1295||1322||Died
|- 
|Alexander Hylton, 2nd Baron Hylton||1322||1360||
|- 
|Baron Knovill (1295)||Bogo de Knovill, 2nd Baron Knovill||1306||1338||
|- 
|rowspan="2"|Baron Kyme (1295)||Philip de Kyme, 1st Baron Kyme||1295||1323||Died
|- 
|William de Kyme, 2nd Baron Kyme||1323||1338||
|- 
|rowspan="2"|Baron Martin (1295)||William Martin, 1st Baron Martin||1295||1325||Died
|- 
|William Martin, 2nd Baron Martin||1325||1326||Died, Barony fell into abeyance
|- 
|Baron Mauley (1295)||Peter de Mauley, 2nd Baron Mauley||1310||1355||
|- 
|Baron Meinill (1295)||Nicholas Meinill, 2nd Baron Meinill||1299||1322||Died, Barony became dormant
|- 
|Baron Montfort (1295)||John de Montfort, 3rd Baron Montfort||1314||1367||
|- 
|Baron Mortimer of Wigmore (1295)||Roger de Mortimer, 2nd Baron Mortimer de Wigmore||1304||1330||Created Earl of March in 1328, see above; title held by the Earls of March until 1461 when it merged into Crown
|- 
|Baron Neville de Raby(1295)||Ralph Neville, 1st Baron Neville de Raby||1295||1331||
|- 
|Baron Plugenet (1295)||Alan de Plugenet, 2nd Baron Plugenet||1299||1326||Died, title extinct
|- 
|Baron Poyntz (1295)||Hugh Poyntz, 3rd Baron Poyntz||1311||1333||
|- 
|rowspan="2"|Baron Segrave (1295)||John de Segrave, 2nd Baron Segrave||1295||1325||Died
|- 
|John de Segrave, 3rd Baron Segrave||1325||1353||
|- 
|rowspan="2"|Baron Segrave of Barton Segrave (1295)||Nicholas de Segrave, 1st Baron Segrave of Barton Segrave||1295||1322||Died
|- 
|Maud de Segrave, Baroness Segrave of Barton Segrave||1322||1330||Died, title extinct
|- 
|rowspan="2"|Baron Umfraville (1295)||Robert de Umfraville, 2nd Baron Umfraville||1307||1325||Died
|- 
|Gilbert de Umfraville, 3rd Baron Umfraville||1325||1381||
|- 
|Baron Wake (1295)||John Wake, 1st Baron Wake||1300||1349||
|- 
|rowspan="2"|Baron Bardolf (1299)||Thomas Bardolf, 2nd Baron Bardolf||1304||1328||Died
|- 
|John Bardolf, 3rd Baron Bardolf||1328||1363||
|- 
|Baron Clinton (1299)||John de Clinton, 2nd Baron Clinton||1310||1335||
|- 
|rowspan="2"|Baron De La Warr (1299)||Roger la Warr, 1st Baron De La Warr||1299||1320||Died
|- 
|John la Warr, 2nd Baron De La Warr||1320||1347||
|- 
|rowspan="2"|Baron Deincourt (1299)||Edmund Deincourt, 1st Baron Deincourt||1299||1327||Died
|- 
|William Deincourt, 2nd Baron Deincourt||1327||1364||
|- 
|Baron Devereux (1299)||William Devereux, 1st Baron Devereux||1299||1330?||
|- 
|Baron Engaine (1299)||John Engaine, 1st Baron Engaine||1299||1322||Died, Barony extinct
|- 
|rowspan="2"|Baron Ferrers of Chartley (1299)||John de Ferrers, 2nd Baron Ferrers of Chartley||1312||c1324||Died
|- 
|Robert de Ferrers, 3rd Baron Ferrers of Chartley||c1324||1350||
|- 
|Baron FitzPayne (1299)||Robert FitzPayne, 2nd Baron FitzPayne||1316||1354||
|- 
|Baron Grandison (1299)||William de Grandison, 1st Baron Grandison||1299||1335||
|- 
|Baron Havering (1299)||John de Havering, 1st Baron Havering||1299||1329||Peerage extinct or dormant
|- 
|Baron Lancaster (1299)||Henry Plantagenet, 1st Baron Lancaster||1299||1345||Restored as Earl of Lancaster, see above
|- 
|Baron Lovel (1299)||John Lovel, 3rd Baron Lovel||1314||1347||
|- 
|Baron Mohun (1299)||John de Mohun, 1st Baron Mohun||1299||1330||
|- 
|Baron Mortimer of Chirke (1299)||Roger de Mortimer, 1st Baron Mortimer of Chirke||1299||1336||
|- 
|rowspan="2"|Baron Multon of Egremont (1299)||Thomas de Multon, 1st Baron Multon of Egremont||1299||1322||Died
|- 
|John de Multon, 2nd Baron Multon of Egremont||1322||1334||
|- 
|Baron Percy (1299)||Henry de Percy, 2nd Baron Percy||1315||1352||
|- 
|Baron Rivers of Ongar (1299)||John Rivers, 2nd Baron Rivers||1311||1350||
|- 
|rowspan="2"|Baron Scales (1299)||Robert de Scales, 2nd Baron Scales||1305||1324||Died
|- 
|Robert de Scales, 3rd Baron Scales||1324||1369||
|- 
|Baron Stafford (1299)||Ralph de Stafford, 2nd Baron Stafford||1309||1372||
|- 
|rowspan="2"|Baron Tregoz (1299)||Henry de Tregoz, 2nd Baron Tregoz||1305||1322||Died
|- 
|Thomas de Tregoz, 3rd Baron Tregoz||1322||1405||
|- 
|Baron Teyes (1299)||Henry de Teyes, 2nd Baron Teyes||1308||1321||Attainted, and the Barony was forfeited
|- 
|Baron Valence (1299)||Aymer de Valence, 1st Baron Valence||1299||1323||Died, Barony extinct
|- 
|Baron Vavasour (1299)||Walter de Vavasour, 2nd Baron Vavasour||1313||1325||Died; none of his descendants were summoned to Parliament in respect of this Barony
|- 
|rowspan="2"|Baron Welles (1299)||Robert de Welles, 2nd Baron Welles||1311||1320||Died
|- 
|Adam de Welles, 3rd Baron Welles||1320||1345||
|- 
|Baron Beauchamp of Somerset (1299)|| John de Beauchamp, 1st Baron Beauchamp ||1299||1336||
|- 
|Baron Braose (1299)||William de Braose, 2nd Baron Braose||1299||1326||Died, Barony fell into abeyance
|- 
|rowspan="2"|Baron Cauntelo (1299)||William de Cauntelo, 2nd Baron Cauntelo||1308||1321||Died
|- 
|Nicholas de Cauntelo, 3rd Baron Cauntelo||1321||1355||
|- 
|rowspan="2"|Baron de Clifford (1299)||Roger de Clifford, 2nd Baron de Clifford||1314||1322||Died
|- 
|Robert de Clifford, 3rd Baron de Clifford||1322||1344||
|- 
|Baron Darcy (1299)||Philip Darcy, Baron Darcy||1299||1332||
|- 
|Baron De La Ward (1299)||Simon de La Ward, 2nd Baron De La Ward||1307||1324||Died, Barony fell into abeyance
|- 
|rowspan="2"|Baron Ferrers of Groby (1299)||William Ferrers, 1st Baron Ferrers of Groby||1299||1325||Died
|- 
|Henry Ferrers, 2nd Baron Ferrers of Groby||1325||1343||
|- 
|Baron Furnivall (1299)||Thomas de Furnivall, 1st Baron Furnivall||1299||1332||
|- 
|Baron Grendon (1299)||Ralph Grendon, 1st Baron Grendon||1299||1331||
|- 
|Baron Lancaster (1299)||John de Lancastre, 1st Baron Lancaster||1299||1334||
|- 
|Baron Latimer (1299)||Thomas Latimer, 1st Baron Latimer||1299||1334||
|- 
|rowspan="2"|Baron Latimer (1299)||William Latimer, 2nd Baron Latimer||1305||1327||Died
|- 
|William Latimer, 3rd Baron Latimer||1327||1335||
|- 
|Baron Lisle (1299)|| John de Lisle, 2nd Baron Lisle ||1304||1337||
|- 
|Baron Montagu (1299)||William de Montacute, 3rd Baron Montagu||1319||1344||
|- 
|Baron Morley (1299)||Robert de Morley, 2nd Baron Morley||1310||1360||
|- 
|Baron Pecche (1299)||Gilbert Peche, 1st Baron Peche||1299||1322||Died; none of his heirs were summoned to Parliament in respect of this Barony
|- 
|Baron Roche (1299)||Thomas de la Roche, 1st Baron Roche||1299||1320||Died
|- 
|Baron Saint John of Basing (1299)||John St John, 1st Baron Saint John of Basing||1299||1329||Died
|- 
|rowspan="2"|Baron Saint John of Lageham (1299)||John St John, 2nd Baron Saint John of Lageham||1317||1323||Died
|- 
|John St John, 3rd Baron Saint John of Lageham||1323||1349||
|- 
|rowspan="2"|Baron Strange of Knockyn (1299)||John le Strange, 3rd Baron Strange of Knockyn||1311||1324||Died
|- 
|Roger le Strange, 4th Baron Strange of Knockyn||1324||1349||
|- 
|Baron Sudeley (1299)||John de Sudeley, 1st Baron Sudeley||1299||1336||
|- 
|rowspan="2"|Baron Botetourt (1305)||John de Botetourt, 1st Baron Botetourt||1305||1324||Died
|- 
|John de Botetourt, 2nd Baron Botetourt||1324||1385||
|- 
|Baron Multon of Gilsland (1307)||John de Multon, 2nd Baron Multon of Gilsland||1313||1334||
|- 
|Baron Thweng (1307)||Marmaduke de Thweng, 1st Baron Thweng||1307||1323||Died; none of his heirs were summoned to Parliament in respect of this Barony
|- 
|Baron Boteler of Wemme (1308)||William Le Boteler, 1st Baron Boteler of Wemme||1308||1334||
|- 
|Baron Cromwell (1308)||John de Cromwell, 1st Baron Cromwell||1308||1335||
|- 
|Baron Grelle (1308)||Thomas de Grelle, 1st Baron Grelle||1308||1347||
|- 
|Baron Somery (1308)||John de Somery, 1st Baron Somery||1308||1321||Died, Barony became extinct
|- 
|Baron Zouche of Haryngworth (1308)||William la Zouche, 1st Baron Zouche||1308||1352||
|- 
|Baron Ufford (1309)||Robert de Ufford, 2nd Baron Ufford||1316||1369||
|- 
|Baron Beaumont (1309)||Henry Beaumont, 1st Baron Beaumont||1309||1340||
|- 
|Baron Everingham (1309)||Adam Everingham, 1st Baron Everingham||1309||1341||
|- 
|Baron FitzHenry (1309)||Aucher FitzHenry, 1st Baron FitzHenry||1309||1339||
|- 
|Baron Gorges (1309)||Ralph de Gorges, 1st Baron Gorges||1309||1324||Died, Barony fell into abeyance
|- 
|rowspan="2"|Baron Monthermer (1309)||Ralph de Monthermer, 1st Baron Monthermer||1309||1325||Died
|- 
|Thomas de Monthermer, 2nd Baron Monthermer||1325||1340||
|- 
|rowspan="2"|Baron Strange of Blackmere (1309)||Fulk le Strange, 1st Baron Strange of Blackmere||1309||1324||Died
|- 
|John le Strange, 2nd Baron Strange of Blackmere||1324||1349||
|- 
|Baron Thorpe (1309)||John de Thorpe, 1st Baron Thorpe||1309||1325||Died, Barony extinct
|- 
|rowspan="2"|Baron Badlesmere (1309)||Bartholomew de Badlesmere, 1st Baron Badlesmere||1309||1322||Died
|- 
|Giles de Badlesmere, 2nd Baron Badlesmere||1322||1338||
|- 
|Baron Echingham (1311)||William de Echingham, 1st Baron Echingham||1311||1326||Died, Barony became extinct
|- 
|Baron Lisle (1311)||Robert de Lisle, 1st Baron Lisle||1311||1343||
|- 
|Baron Nevill (1311)||Hugh de Nevill, 1st Baron Nevill||1311||1336||
|- 
|Baron Audley of Heleigh (1313)||James de Audley, 2nd Baron Audley of Heleigh||1316||1386||
|- 
|Baron Bavent (1313)||Roger Bavent, 1st Baron Bavent||1313||1335||
|- 
|Baron Brun (1313)||Maurice le Brun, 1st Baron Brun||1313||1355||
|- 
|Baron Cobham of Kent (1313)||Henry de Cobham, 1st Baron Cobham of Kent||1313||1339||
|- 
|Baron FitzBernard (1313)||Thomas Fitzbernard, 1st Baron Fitzbernard||1313||Bef. 1334||
|- 
|Baron Northwode (1313)||Roger de Northwode, 2nd Baron Northwode||1319||1361||
|- 
|Baron Saint Amand (1313)||John de St Amand, 1st Baron Saint Amand||1313||1330||
|- 
|Baron Cherleton (1313)||John Cherleton, 1st Baron Cherleton||1313||1353||
|- 
|rowspan="2"|Baron Marmion (1313)||John Marmion, 1st Baron Marmion||1313||1323||Died
|- 
|John Marmion, 2nd Baron Marmion||1323||1335||
|- 
|rowspan="2"|Baron Say (1313)||Geoffrey de Say, 1st Baron Say||1313||1322||Died
|- 
|Geoffrey de Say, 2nd Baron Say||1322||1359||
|- 
|Baron Willoughby de Eresby (1313)||John de Willoughby, 2nd Baron Willoughby de Eresby||1317||1349||
|- 
|Baron Camoys (1313)||Ralph de Camoys, 1st Baron Camoys||1313||1335||
|- 
|Baron Columbers (1314)||Philip de Columbers, 1st Baron Columbers||1314||1342||
|- 
|Baron le Despencer (1314)||Hugh Despencer, 1st Lord Despencer||1314||1326||All his honours became forfeited
|- 
|rowspan="2"|Baron Holand (1314)||Robert de Holland, 1st Baron Holand||1314||1328||Died
|- 
|Robert de Holland, 2nd Baron Holand||1328||1373||
|- 
|Baron Audley (1317)||Hugh de Audley, 1st Baron Audley||1317||1347||
|- 
|Baron D'Amorie (1317)||Roger D'Amorie, 1st Baron D'Amorie||1317||1322||Attainted and his honours were forfeited
|- 
|Baron Plaiz (1317)||Richard de Playz, 1st Baron Playz||1317||1327||Died, none of his heirs were summoned to Parliament in respect of this Barony
|- 
|Baron Saint Maur (1317)||William de St Maur, 1st Baron Saint Maur||1317||1322||Died
|- 
|rowspan="2"|Baron Strabolgi (1318)||David Strabolgi, 1st Baron Strabolgi||1318||1326||Died
|- 
|David Strabolgi, 2nd Baron Strabolgi||1326||1335||
|- 
|rowspan="2"|Baron Arcedekne (1321)||Thomas le Arcedekne, 1st Baron Arcedekne||1321||1329||New creation, died
|- 
|John le Arcedekne, 2nd Baron Arcedekne||1329||1350||
|- 
|Baron Audley of Stratton Audley (1321)||Hugh de Audley, 1st Baron Audley of Stratton Audley||1321||1325||New creation; title forfeited by attainder
|- 
|Baron Dacre (1321)||Ralph Dacre, 1st Baron Dacre||1321||1339||New creation
|- 
|Baron FitzHugh (1321)||Henry FitzHugh, 1st Baron FitzHugh||1321||1356||New creation
|- 
|rowspan="2"|Baron Greystock (1321)||Ralph de Greystock, 1st Baron Greystock||1321||1323||New creation, died
|- 
|William de Greystock, 2nd Baron Greystock||1323||1358||
|- 
|Baron Lucy (1321)||Anthony de Lucy, 1st Baron Lucy||1321||1343||New creation
|- 
|Baron Pecche of Wormleighton (1321)||John Peche, 1st Baron Peche||1321||1339||New creation
|- 
|Baron Waleys (1321)||Richard Waleys, 1st Baron Waleys||1321||?||New creation
|- 
|Baron Zouche of Mortimer (1323)||William la Zouche, 1st Baron Zouche of Mortimer||1323||1337||New creation
|- 
|Baron Aton (1324)||Gilbert de Aton, 1st Baron Aton||1324||1342||New creation
|- 
|Baron Cobham (1324)||Ralph de Cobham, 1st Baron Cobham||1324||1325||New creation; died, title extinct
|- 
|Baron Grey of Ruthyn (1325)||Roger Grey, 1st Baron Grey de Ruthyn||1324||1353||New creation
|- 
|Baron Harington (1326)||John Harington, 1st Baron Harington||1324||1347||New creation
|- 
|Baron Blount (1326)||Thomas le Blount, 1st Baron Blount||1326||1330||New creation
|- 
|Baron Cobham of Rundale (1326)||Stephen de Cobham, 1st Baron Cobham of Rundale||1326||1332||New creation
|- 
|Baron D'Amorie (1326)||Richard D'Amorie, 1st Baron D'Amorie||1326||1330||New creation
|- 
|Baron Strange (1326)||Eubulus le Strange, 1st Baron Strange||1326||1335||New creation
|- 
|Baron Swillington (1326)||Adam Swillington, 1st Baron Swillington||1326||1328||New creation; died, title became extinct
|- 
|Baron Wateville (1326)||Robert Wateville, 1st Baron Wateville||1326||1333||New creation
|- 
|Baron Burgh (1327)||William de Burgh, 1st Baron Burgh||1327||1333||New creation
|- 
|Baron Ingham (1328)||Oliver de Ingham, 1st Baron Ingham||1328||1344||New creation
|-
|}

Peerage of Scotland

|Earl of Mar (1114)||Domhnall II, Earl of Mar||1305||1332||
|-
|Earl of Dunbar (1115)||Patrick V, Earl of March||1308||1368||
|-
|rowspan=2|Earl of Strathearn (1115)||Maol Íosa IV, Earl of Strathearn||1317||1329||Died
|-
|Maol Íosa V, Earl of Strathearn||1329||1334||
|-
|Earl of Fife (1129)||Donnchadh IV, Earl of Fife||1288||1353||
|-
|Earl of Menteith (1160)||Muireadhach III, Earl of Menteith||1308||1333||
|-
|Earl of Lennox (1184)||Maol Choluim II, Earl of Lennox||1291||1333||
|-
|Earl of Ross (1215)||Uilleam II, Earl of Ross||1274||1333||
|-
|Earl of Sutherland (1235)||William de Moravia, 3rd Earl of Sutherland||1307||1330||
|-
|Earl of Moray (1312)||Thomas Randolph, 1st Earl of Moray||1312||1332||
|-
|Earl of Atholl (1320)||John Campbell, Earl of Atholl||1320||1333||New creation
|-
|}

Peerage of Ireland

|rowspan=2|Earl of Ulster (1264)||Richard Óg de Burgh, 2nd Earl of Ulster||1271||1326||Died
|-
|William Donn de Burgh, 3rd Earl of Ulster||1326||1333||
|-
|rowspan=3|Earl of Kildare (1316)||Thomas FitzGerald, 2nd Earl of Kildare||1316||1328||Died
|-
|Richard FitzGerald, 3rd Earl of Kildare||1328||1329||Died
|-
|Maurice FitzGerald, 4th Earl of Kildare||1329||1390||
|-
|Earl of Louth (1319)||John de Bermingham, 1st Earl of Louth||1319||1329||Died, title extinct
|-
|Earl of Ormond (1328)||James Butler, 1st Earl of Ormond||1328||1338||New creation
|-
|Earl of Desmond (1329)||Maurice FitzGerald, 1st Earl of Desmond||1329||1356||New creation
|-
|rowspan=2|Baron Athenry (1172)||Rickard de Bermingham||1307||1322||Died
|-
|Thomas de Bermingham||1322||1374||
|-
|Baron Kingsale (1223)||Miles de Courcy, 6th Baron Kingsale||1303||1338||
|-
|rowspan=2|Baron Kerry (1223)||Nicholas Fitzmaurice, 3rd Baron Kerry||1303||1324||Died
|-
|Maurice Fitzmaurice, 4th Baron Kerry||1324||1339||
|-
|Baron Barry (1261)||John Barry, 4th Baron Barry||1290||1330||
|-
|}

References

 

Lists of peers by decade
1320s in England
1320s in Ireland
14th century in Scotland
14th-century English people
14th-century Irish people
14th-century Scottish earls
1320 in Europe
14th century in England
14th century in Ireland
Peers